Alex O'Connell may refer to:

 Alex O'Connell (fencer) (born 1988), British Olympic fencer
 Alex O'Connell (fictional character), a character in The Mummy film series
 Alex O'Connell (basketball) (born 1999), American basketball player for the Duke Blue Devils and Creighton Bluejays